Activating transcription factor 4 (tax-responsive enhancer element B67), also known as ATF4, is a protein that in humans is encoded by the ATF4  gene.

Function 

This gene encodes a transcription factor that was originally identified as a widely expressed mammalian DNA binding protein that could bind a tax-responsive enhancer element in the LTR of HTLV-1. The encoded protein was also isolated and characterized as the cAMP-response element binding protein 2 (CREB-2). ATF4 is not a functional transcription factor by itself but one-half of many possible heterodimeric transcription factors. Because ATF4 can simultaneously participate in multiple distinct heterodimers, the overall set of genes that require ATF4 for maximal expression in a specific context (ATF4-dependent genes) can be a mixture of genes that are regulated by different ATF4 heterodimers, with some ATF4-dependent genes activated by one ATF4 heterodimer and other ATF4-dependent genes activated by other ATF4 heterodimers.

The protein encoded by this gene belongs to a family of DNA-binding proteins that includes the AP-1 family of transcription factors, cAMP-response element binding proteins (CREBs) and CREB-like proteins. These transcription factors share a leucine zipper region that is involved in protein–protein interactions, located C-terminal to a stretch of basic amino acids that functions as a DNA-binding domain. Two alternative transcripts encoding the same protein have been described. Two pseudogenes are located on the X chromosome at q28 in a region containing a large inverted duplication.

ATF4 transcription factor is also known to play role in osteoblast differentiation along with RUNX2 and osterix. Terminal osteoblast differentiation, represented by matrix mineralization, is significantly inhibited by the inactivation of JNK. JNK inactivation downregulates expression of ATF-4 and, subsequently, matrix mineralization. IMPACT protein regulates ATF4 in C. elegans to promote lifespan.

Translation 

The translation of ATF4 is dependent on upstream open reading frames located in the 5'UTR.  The location of the second uORF, aptly named uORF2, overlaps with the ATF4 open-reading frame. During normal conditions, the uORF1 is translated, and then translation of uORF2 occurs only after eIF2-TC has been reacquired. Translation of the uORF2 requires that the ribosomes pass by the ATF4 ORF, whose start codon is located within uORF2. This leads to its repression.  However, during stress conditions, the 40S ribosome will bypass uORF2 because of a decrease in concentration of eIF2-TC, which means the ribosome does not acquire one in time to translate uORF2.  Instead ATF4 is translated.

See also 
 Activating transcription factor

References

Further reading

External links 
 
 
 PDBe-KB provides an overview of all the structure information available in the PDB for Human Cyclic AMP-dependent transcription factor ATF-4

Transcription factors